Now Guran (also Romanized as Now Gūrān) is a village in Khorram Rud Rural District, in the Central District of Lenjan County, Isfahan Province, Iran. At the 2006 census, its population was 3,196, in 837 families.

References 

Populated places in Lenjan County